Stuart Shaw (born 9 October 1944) is an English former footballer who played as a right-sided winger in the Football League for Everton, Southport, and Port Vale. He also made one senior appearance for Crystal Palace in the FA Cup. He later played Northern Premier League football with Morecambe, Skelmersdale United and South Liverpool. He won promotion out of the Fourth Division with Port Vale in 1969–70.

Career
Shaw played for Aintree Villa Colts, before joining Harry Catterick's Everton. He played three First Division games for the "Toffees", as the Goodison Park outfit posted fourth and 11th-place finishes in the 1964–65 and 1965–66 campaigns. He dropped into the Second Division with Dick Graham's Crystal Palace in December 1966, but did not make a league appearance at Selhurst Park in the 1966–67 season and departed in March 1967. He made one appearance as a substitute in the FA Cup third round as Palace lost 0–3 away to Leeds United.

Shaw spent the 1967–68 and 1968–69 seasons with Southport, and scored six goals in 67 Third Division appearances under the stewardship of Billy Bingham and Don McEvoy. He left Haig Avenue and joined Gordon Lee's Port Vale in July 1969. He made his debut at Vale Park in a goalless draw with Peterborough United on 9 August, but was sidelined after breaking his rib in the match. He recovered to play four further games that season, as the "Valiants" won promotion out of the Fourth Division. He was given a free transfer to Northern Premier League side Morecambe in May 1970. He later played for Skelmersdale United and South Liverpool in the Northern Premier League, and then non-league sides Howard Sports and Fleetwood Hesketh.

Career statistics
Sources:

Honours
Port Vale
Football League Fourth Division fourth-place promotion: 1969–70

References

1944 births
Living people
Footballers from Liverpool
English footballers
Association football wingers
Everton F.C. players
Crystal Palace F.C. players
Southport F.C. players
Port Vale F.C. players
Morecambe F.C. players
Skelmersdale United F.C. players
South Liverpool F.C. players
English Football League players
Northern Premier League players